Sevada is a genus of flowering plants belonging to the family Amaranthaceae.

Its native range is Egypt to Northeastern Tropical Africa, Arabian Peninsula.

Species:

Sevada schimperi

References

Amaranthaceae
Amaranthaceae genera